The 1933 SMU Mustangs football team represented Southern Methodist University (SMU) as a member of the Southwest Conference (SWC) during the 1933 college football season. Led by 14th-year head coach Ray Morrison, the Mustangs compiled an overall record of 4–7–1 with a mark of 2–4 in conference play, placing sixth in the SWC.

Schedule

References

SMU
SMU Mustangs football seasons
SMU Mustangs football